Eastern Suburbs (now known as the Sydney Roosters) competed in the 31st New South Wales Rugby League season in 1928.

Details
 Home Ground:Agricultural Ground
 Lineup: Cyril Abotomey Coach;
• G. Boddigton,
• Dick Brown(HK)
• Sam Byrant 
• Joe 'Chimpy' Busch(HB)
• Hugh Byrne
• A.Carter
• Bill Cole (HB)
• Bill Dyer
• Gordon Fletcher
• T.Fitzpatrick
• Nelson Hardy
• G.Harris
• Larry Hedger
• H.Kavanagh
• Arthur Oxford
• Norm Pope
• Les Steel
• A.Toby
• Tom Trotter
• Vic Webber(WG).

Ladder

Season summary

 Eastern Suburbs finished the season as runners-up after being defeated by South Sydney in that year's premier decider.
 Eastern Suburbs took part in the first night rugby league match to be played in Australia. A ten aside exhibition match that was played between the two premiership finalists, Souths were victorious once again winning 10–6.

Results

 Premiership Round 1, 21 April 1928;
Eastern Suburbs 18 (4 Tries; 3 Goals) defeated University 14(2 Tries; 4 Goals) at the Agricultural Ground.

 Premiership Semi-Final, 7 September 1928
Eastern Suburbs 26(Steel 2, Webber, H. Kavanagh, Oxford Tries; Oxford 4 Goals) defeated North Sydney 13( K. Woods, T. Murray, L. McGrath Tries; L. Carroll 2 Goals) at Wentworth Park. With 8 minutes remaining and scores locked at 13 all, Easts' piled on three tries in quick time against an exhausted North Sydney who finished the match with just eleven men.

 Premiership Final, 15 September 1928;
South Sydney 26( Harry Kadwell, George Treweek, Williams, Quinlivan Tries;  B. Wearing 2, Quinlivivan Goals) defeated Eastern Suburbs 5(Steel Try; Oxford Goal) at the Agricultural Ground. Details

References

Sydney Roosters seasons
East